A liquid metal cooled nuclear reactor, or LMR is a type of nuclear reactor where the primary coolant is a liquid metal. Liquid metal cooled reactors were first adapted for breeder reactor power generation. They have also been used to power nuclear submarines.

Due to their high thermal conductivity, metal coolants remove heat effectively, enabling high power density. This makes them attractive in situations where size and weight are at a premium, like on ships and submarines. To improve cooling with water, most reactor designs are highly pressurized to raise the boiling point, which presents safety and maintenance issues that liquid metal designs lack. Additionally, the high temperature of the liquid metal can be used to drive power conversion cycles with high thermodynamic efficiency. This makes them attractive for improving power output, cost effectiveness, and fuel efficiency in nuclear power plants.

Liquid metals, being electrically highly conductive, can be moved by electromagnetic pumps. Disadvantages include difficulties associated with inspection and repair of a reactor immersed in opaque molten metal, and depending on the choice of metal, fire hazard risk (for alkali metals), corrosion and/or production of radioactive activation products may be an issue.

Design
Liquid metal coolant has been applied to both thermal- and fast-neutron reactors. 

To date, most fast neutron reactors have been liquid metal cooled fast reactors (LMFRs). When configured as a breeder reactor (e.g. with a breeding blanket), such reactors are called liquid metal fast breeder reactors (LMFBRs).

Coolant properties

Suitable liquid metal coolants must have a low neutron capture cross section, must not cause excessive corrosion of the structural materials, and must have melting and boiling points that are suitable for the reactor's operating temperature.

Liquid metals generally have high boiling points, reducing the probability that the coolant can boil, which could lead to a loss-of-coolant accident. Low vapor pressure enables operation at near-ambient pressure, dramatically reducing the probability of an accident. Some designs immerse the entire core and heat exchangers into a pool of coolant, virtually eliminating the risk that inner-loop cooling will be lost.

Mercury
Clementine was the first liquid metal cooled nuclear reactor and used mercury coolant, thought to be the obvious choice since it is liquid at room temperature. However, because of disadvantages including high toxicity, high vapor pressure even at room temperature, low boiling point producing noxious fumes when heated, relatively low thermal conductivity, and a high neutron cross-section, it has fallen out of favor.

Sodium and NaK
Sodium and NaK (a eutectic sodium-potassium alloy) do not corrode steel to any significant degree and are compatible with many nuclear fuels, allowing for a wide choice of structural materials. NaK was used as the coolant in the first breeder reactor prototype, the Experimental Breeder Reactor-1, in 1951. 

Sodium and NaK do, however, ignite spontaneously on contact with air and react violently with water, producing hydrogen gas. This was the case at the Monju Nuclear Power Plant in a 1995 accident and fire. Sodium is also the coolant used in the Russian BN reactor series and the Chinese CFR series in commercial operation today. Neutron activation of sodium also causes these liquids to become intensely radioactive during operation, though the half-life is short and therefore their radioactivity does not pose an additional disposal concern.

There are two proposals for a sodium cooled Gen IV LMFR, one based on oxide fuel, the other on the metal-fueled integral fast reactor.

Lead

Lead has excellent neutron properties (reflection, low absorption) and is a very potent radiation shield against gamma rays. The high boiling point of lead provides safety advantages as it can cool the reactor efficiently even if it reaches several hundred degrees Celsius above normal operating conditions. However, because lead has a high melting point and a high vapor pressure, it is tricky to refuel and service a lead cooled reactor. The melting point can be lowered by alloying the lead with bismuth, but lead-bismuth eutectic is highly corrosive to most metals used for structural materials.

Lead-bismuth eutectic

Lead-bismuth eutectic allows operation at lower temperatures while preventing the freezing of the metal coolant in a lower temperature range (eutectic point: . 

Tin
Although tin today is not used as a coolant for working reactors because it builds a crust, it can be a useful additional or replacement coolant at nuclear disasters or loss-of-coolant accidents. 

Further advantages of tin are the high boiling point and the ability to build a crust even over liquid tin helps to cover poisonous leaks and keeps the coolant in and at the reactor. Tin causes any reactor type to be unusable for normal operation. It has been tested by Ukrainian researchers and was proposed to convert the boiling water reactors at the Fukushima Daiichi nuclear disaster into liquid tin cooled reactors.

Propulsion

Submarines
The Soviet   and all seven s used reactors cooled by lead-bismuth eutectic and moderated with beryllium as their propulsion plants. (VT-1 reactors in K-27; BM-40A and OK-550 reactors in others). 

The second nuclear submarine,  was the only U.S. submarine to have a sodium-cooled, beryllium-moderated nuclear power plant. It was commissioned in 1957, but it had leaks in its superheaters, which were bypassed. In order to standardize the reactors in the fleet, the submarine's sodium-cooled, beryllium-moderated reactor was removed starting in 1958 and replaced with a pressurized water reactor.

Nuclear aircraft 
Liquid metal cooled reactors were studied by Pratt & Whitney for use in nuclear aircraft as part of the Aircraft Nuclear Propulsion program.

Power generation
The Sodium Reactor Experiment was an experimental sodium-cooled graphite-moderated nuclear reactor (A Sodium-Graphite Reactor, or SGR) sited in a section of the Santa Susana Field Laboratory then operated by the Atomics International division of North American Aviation. 

In July 1959, the Sodium Reactor Experiment suffered a serious incident involving the partial melting of 13 of 43 fuel elements and a significant release of radioactive gases. The reactor was repaired and returned to service in September 1960 and ended operation in 1964. The reactor produced a total of 37 GW-h of electricity.

SRE was the prototype for the Hallam Nuclear Power Facility, another sodium-cooled graphite-moderated SGR that operated in Nebraska.

Fermi 1 in Monroe County, Michigan was an experimental, liquid sodium-cooled fast breeder reactor that operated from 1963 to 1972. It suffered a partial nuclear meltdown in 1963 and was decommissioned in 1975.

At Dounreay in Caithness, in the far north of Scotland, the United Kingdom Atomic Energy Authority (UKAEA) operated the Dounreay Fast Reactor (DFR), using NaK as a coolant, from 1959 to 1977, exporting 600 GW-h of electricity to the grid over that period. It was succeeded at the same site by PFR, the Prototype Fast Reactor, which operated from 1974 to 1994 and used liquid sodium as its coolant.

The Soviet BN-600 is sodium cooled. The BN-350 and U.S. EBR-II nuclear power plants were sodium cooled. EBR-I used a liquid metal alloy, NaK, for cooling. NaK is liquid at room temperature. Liquid metal cooling is also used in most fast neutron reactors including fast breeder reactors such as the Integral Fast Reactor.

Many Generation IV reactors studied are liquid metal cooled:
 Sodium-cooled fast reactor (SFR)
 Lead-cooled fast reactor

References 

 
Nuclear physics